Serge-Bes (Serge Bes) is a rural locality (a selo), one of two settlements, in addition to Sulgachchy, in Sulgachchinsky Rural Okrug of Aldansky District in the Sakha Republic, Russia. Its population as of the 2010 Census was 265; up from 252 recorded in the 2002 Census.

References

Notes

Sources
Official website of the Sakha Republic. Registry of the Administrative-Territorial Divisions of the Sakha Republic. Amginsky District. 

Rural localities in Amginsky District